Ramappa Temple, also known as the Rudreshwara temple, is a Kakatiya style Hindu temple dedicated to the Hindu god Shiva, located in Telangana, India. An inscription in the temple says it was constructed in the year  by Recherla Rudra—a General of Kakatiya ruler Ganapati Deva (1199–1262). Located in the vicinity of Ramappa Lake, the Ramappa Temple complex which consist of three temples was constructed between 1212 and 1234, designed and architect by Ramappa—after whom the temple complex is named. Marco Polo, during his visit to the Kakatiya empire, supposedly called the temple "the brightest star in the galaxy of temples". On Sunday, July 25, 2021, the United Nations Educational, Scientific and Cultural Organization (UNESCO) inscribed the 13th-century Ramappa in Palampet, Telangana as a World Heritage Site.

Structure 
The hall in front of the sanctum has numerous carved pillars that have been positioned to create an effect that combines light and space wonderfully. The temple is named after the sculptor Ramappa, who built it, making it the only temple in India to be named after its craftsman.

The main structure is in a reddish sandstone, but the columns round the outside have large brackets of black basalt which is rich in iron, magnesium and silica. These are carved as mythical animals or female dancers or musicians, and are "the masterpieces of Kakatiya art, notable for their delicate carving, sensuous postures and elongated bodies and heads". On 25 July 2021, the temple was inscribed as a UNESCO World Heritage Site as "Kakatiya Rudreshwara (Ramappa) Temple, Telangana".

Description 
The roof (garbhalayam) of the temple is built with bricks, which are so light that they are able to float on water. 

There are two small Shiva shrines on either side of the main temple. The enormous Nandi within, facing the shrine of Shiva, remains in good condition.

Nataraja Ramakrishna revived Perini Sivatandavam (Perini Dance), by seeing the sculptures in this temple. The dance poses, written in Nritta Rathnavalid by Jayapa Senaani, also appear in these sculptures.

The temple remained intact even after repeated wars, plunder and destruction during wars and natural disasters. There was a major earthquake during the 17th century which caused some damage. It survived the earthquake due to its 'sandbox technique' of laying foundation.

Many of the smaller structures were neglected and are in ruins. The Archaeological Survey of India has taken charge of it. The main entrance gate in the outer wall of the temple is ruined.

Location

Gallery

References

Bibliography

External links
 

Hindu temples in Hanamkonda district
Tourist attractions in Warangal
Archaeological sites in Telangana
Shiva temples in Telangana
Hindu temples in Telangana
World Heritage Sites in India
Mulugu district